Jonathan Mayhew Wainwright IV (August 23, 1883 – September 2, 1953) was an American army general and the Commander of Allied forces in the Philippines at the time Japan surrendered to the United States, during World War II. 

Wainwright commanded American and Filipino forces during the Japanese invasion the Philippines, for which he received a Medal of Honor for his courageous leadership. In May 1942, on the island stronghold of Corregidor, lacking food, supplies and ammunition, in the interest of minimizing casualties Wainwright surrendered the remaining Allied forces on the Philippines. At the time of his capture, Wainwright was the highest-ranking American prisoner of war, he spent three years in Japanese prison camps, during which he suffered from malnutrition and mistreatment. In August 1945, he was rescued by the Red Army in Manchukuo. Hailed as a hero upon his liberation, on September 5, 1945, shortly after the Japanese surrender, Wainwright was promoted to four-star General.

Early life and training 
Wainwright, nicknamed "Skinny" and "Jim", was born at Fort Walla Walla, an Army post now in Walla Walla, Washington, and was the son of Robert Powell Page Wainwright. His father was a U.S. Army officer who was commissioned a 2nd Lieutenant in the 1st Cavalry in 1875, commanded a squadron at the Battle of Santiago de Cuba during the Spanish–American War, and in 1902 was killed in action in the Philippines. His grandfather was Lieutenant Jonathan Mayhew Wainwright II, USN, who was killed in action during the Battle of Galveston in 1863. Congressman J. Mayhew Wainwright was a cousin.

He graduated from Highland Park High School in Illinois in 1901, and from West Point in 1906. He served as First Captain of the Corps of Cadets.

Wainwright was commissioned in the cavalry. He served with the 1st Cavalry Regiment (United States) in Texas from 1906 to 1908 and in the Philippines from 1908 to 1910, where he saw combat on Jolo, during the Moro Rebellion. Wainwright graduated from the Mounted Service School, Fort Riley, Kansas, in 1916 and was promoted to Captain. By 1917, he was on the staff of the first officer training camp at Plattsburgh, New York.

In 1911, Wainwright married Adele "Kitty" Holley, and had one child with her, Jonathan Mayhew Wainwright V (1913-1996).

World War I 
In February 1918, during World War I, Wainwright was ordered to France. In June, he became assistant chief of staff of the U.S. 82nd Infantry Division, with which he took part in the Saint Mihiel and Meuse-Argonne Offensives. As a temporary lieutenant colonel, he was assigned to occupation duty in Germany with the 3rd Army at Koblenz, Germany, from October 1918 until 1920. Having reverted to the rank of captain, he was then promoted to major.

Inter-war period 
After a year as an instructor at the Cavalry School at Fort Riley, Wainwright was attached to the general staff from 1921 to 1923 and assigned to the 3rd US Cavalry Regiment, Fort Myer, Virginia, from 1923–25. In 1929, he was promoted to lieutenant colonel and graduated from the Command and General Staff School, Fort Leavenworth, Kansas, in 1931, and from the Army War College in 1934.

Wainwright was promoted to colonel in 1935, and served as commander of the 3rd US Cavalry Regiment until 1938, when he was promoted to brigadier general in command of the 1st Cavalry Brigade at Fort Clark, Texas.

World War II 

In September 1940, Wainwright was promoted to major general (temporary) and returned to the Philippines, in December, as commander of the Philippine Department.

As the senior field commander of Filipino and US forces under General Douglas MacArthur, Wainwright was responsible for resisting the Japanese invasion of the Philippines, which began in December 1941. On December 8, 1941, he commanded the North Luzon Force, comprising three reserve Filipino divisions and the 26th Cavalry Regiment (Philippine Scouts). Retreating from the Japanese beachhead of Lingayen Gulf, Allied forces had withdrawn onto the Bataan Peninsula and Corregidor by January 1942, where they defended the entrance to Manila Bay.

Following the evacuation of MacArthur to Australia in March to serve as Allied Supreme Commander, South West Pacific Area, Wainwright inherited the unenviable position of Allied commander in the Philippines. Also that March, Wainwright was promoted to lieutenant general (temporary). On April 9, the 70,000 troops on Bataan surrendered under the command of Major General Edward P. King. On May 5, the Japanese attacked Corregidor. Due to lack of supplies (mainly food and ammunition) and in the interest of minimizing casualties, Wainwright notified Japanese General Masaharu Homma he was surrendering on May 6.

Wainwright at the same time sent a coded message to Maj. Gen. William F. Sharp, in charge of forces on Mindanao naming him as commander of all forces in the Philippines, excepting those on Corregidor and three other islands in Manila Bay. Sharp was now to report to Gen. MacArthur, now stationed in Australia. This was to cause as few troops as possible to be surrendered. Homma refused to allow the surrender of any less than all the troops in the Philippines and considered the troops on and around Corregidor to be hostages to ensure other forces in the Philippines would lay down their arms. Wainwright then agreed to surrender Sharp's men.

General Sharp was placed in a difficult position. He knew if he ignored Wainwright's wish for him to surrender that the hostage troops and civilians at Corregidor could be massacred. Though his troops were badly mauled, they could still put up a fight. It had been expected they would fight on as a guerrilla force. In the end, on May 10 Sharp decided to surrender. Sharp's surrender proved problematic for the Japanese.  For although Sharp and many of his men surrendered and suffered as prisoners of war until liberated in 1945, a large number of Sharp's men — the vast majority of them Filipino — refused to surrender. Some soldiers considered Wainwright's surrender to have been made under duress, and ultimately decided to join the guerrilla movement led by Colonel Wendell Fertig.

By June 9, Allied forces had completely surrendered. Wainwright was then held in prison camps in northern Luzon, Formosa, and Liaoyuan (then called Xi'an and a county within Manchukuo) until he was rescued by the Red Army in August 1945.

Wainwright was the highest-ranking American POW, and, despite his rank, his treatment at the hands of the Japanese was no less unpleasant than that of most of his men. When he met General MacArthur in August 1945 shortly after his liberation, he had become thin and malnourished from three years of mistreatment during captivity. Together with Percival, he returned to the Philippines to receive the surrender of the local Japanese commander, Lieutenant-General Tomoyuki Yamashita.

Dubbed by his men a "fighting" general who was willing to get down in the foxholes, Wainwright won the respect of all who were imprisoned with him. He agonized over his decision to surrender Corregidor throughout his captivity, feeling that he had let his country down. Upon release, the first question he asked was how people back in the U.S. thought of him, and he was amazed when told he was considered a hero. He later received the Medal of Honor, an honor which had first been proposed early in his captivity, in 1942, but was rejected due to the vehement opposition of General MacArthur, who felt that Corregidor should not have been surrendered. MacArthur did not oppose the renewed proposal in 1945.

Post-war years and retirement 
On September 5, 1945, shortly after the Japanese surrender, Wainwright was promoted to four-star General. On September 13, a ticker-tape parade in New York City was held in his honor. On September 28, 1945, he was named commander of the Second Service Command and the Eastern Defense Command at Fort Jay, Governors Island, New York.

On January 11, 1946, he was named commander of the Fourth Army at Fort Sam Houston, Texas, filling the vacancy left by the November 21, 1945 death of Lt. General Alexander Patch.  Patch, formerly commander of Seventh Army in the closing days of World War II, had returned in poor health to head Fourth Army in August 1945.

Wainwright reluctantly ended his army career on August 31, 1947 upon reaching the mandatory retirement age of 64. In an emotional military review at Fort Sam Houston, he remarked with a touch of sadness, "This is not an occasion at which I can open my brief remarks with the somewhat stereotyped statement that I am happy to be here. For the generous tribute you have paid me here today I am deeply grateful." He went on to say, "For an old soldier to say that it is a pleasure to take his last review, to address his troops for the last time, and to make his last public appearance as a commander, is in my mind at least a  stretch of the imagination and a far cry from the truth."

He became a Freemason in May 1946 at Union Lodge No. 7. in Junction City, Kansas, and a Shriner soon after.

In 1948, he was elected the national commander of Disabled American Veterans (DAV). 

About 1935, Wainwright was elected a Hereditary Companion of the Military Order of the Loyal Legion of the United States (insignia number 19087) by right of his grandfather's service in the Union Navy during the Civil War.  He was also a Compatriot of the Empire State Society of the Sons of the American Revolution (national number 66232 and state number 7762).  His membership application for the SAR was endorsed by General Douglas MacArthur.

He served on the board of directors for several corporations after his retirement. He made himself available to speak before veterans' groups and filled almost every request to do so. He never felt any bitterness toward MacArthur for his actions in the Philippines or MacArthur's attempt to deny him the Medal of Honor. In fact, when it appeared that MacArthur might be nominated for president at the 1948 Republican National Convention, Wainwright stood ready to make the nominating speech.

He died of a stroke in San Antonio, Texas on September 2, 1953, aged 70.

Wainwright was buried in Section 1 of Arlington National Cemetery, next to his wife and near his parents. Present during the funeral were Omar Bradley, George Marshall and Edward King, with a conspicuous absence of MacArthur. He was buried with a Masonic service, and is one of the few people to have had their funeral held in the lower level of the Memorial Amphitheater.

Awards

Medal of Honor citation 
Rank and Organization: General, Commanding U.S. Army Forces in the Philippines. Place and date: Philippine Islands, 12 March to 7 May 1942. Entered Service at: Skaneateles, N.Y. Birth: Walla Walla, Wash. G.O. No.: 80, 19 September 1945.

Citation:
Distinguished himself by intrepid and determined leadership against greatly superior enemy forces. At the repeated risk of life above and beyond the call of duty in his position, he frequented the firing line of his troops where his presence provided the example and incentive that helped make the gallant efforts of these men possible. The final stand on beleaguered Corregidor, for which he was in an important measure personally responsible, commanded the admiration of the Nation's allies. It reflected the high morale of American arms in the face of overwhelming odds. His courage and resolution were a vitally needed inspiration to the then sorely pressed freedom-loving peoples of the world.

General Wainwright was presented the Medal of Honor in an impromptu ceremony when he visited the White House 10 September 1945 – he was not aware that he was there to be decorated by President Truman.

Other official awards 
Army General Staff Badge
Conspicuous Service Cross, State of New York
Distinguished Service Medal, Commonwealth of Massachusetts
Mexican Medal of Military Virtue, 1st Class
Polish Order of Virtuti Militari

Private honors 
Knights Commander of the Court of Honour (K.C.C.H.) (Freemasonry)
Grand Lodge of New York's Masonic Achievement Medal

Promotions

Namesakes 
Fort Wainwright in Alaska is named for him.
U.S. Army Wainwright Station, Fort Sam Houston, San Antonio, Texas
A street, Wainwright Drive, was named after him in Pittsburgh, Pennsylvania.
There is a street, Wainwright Drive, in El Paso, Texas named after Jonathan Wainwright, as was also an elementary school in the El Paso Independent School District; Wainwright Elementary School opened in 1949 and was closed and placed on reserve status in 2005 in light of the expansion of Fort Bliss through BRAC. It currently serves as a science education resource center; until November 2009; it also served as a student health center.
The Veterans Hospital in Walla Walla, Washington is the Jonathan M. Wainwright IV Medical Center.
There is a memorial to General Wainwright on Corregidor Island.
There is a Wainwright Drive located in Skaneateles, New York, serving as the entrance to American Legion Post 239. 
There is a Wainwright Street located in the Twinbrook section of Rockville, Maryland.
There is a Wainwright Drive in San Jose, California.
There is a Wainwright Avenue in Closter, New Jersey.
There is a Wainwright Court at California State University, Monterey Bay at the former Fort Ord
The Jonathan M. Wainwright Award is named in his honor at the Freemasonic National Sojourners Marvin Shields Camp Heros of '76, Olympic Chapter No. 539  and is awarded yearly.
There was a Wainwright School for US Air Force dependents at Tainan Air Base, Taiwan, from 1953 to 1976.
There is a General Wainwright Drive in Lake Charles, Louisiana.
There is a housing area on Fort Hood, Texas, called Wainwright Heights.
There is a Wainwright Street in Benicia, California (1942 residential subdivision) 
Wainwright VFW Post 2185 in Panama City, Florida 
Wainwright Elementary School in the Houston Independent School District is named after him.

Film 
In the film MacArthur (1977), Wainwright was portrayed by Sandy Kenyon.

Works

See also 
List of Medal of Honor recipients
List of Medal of Honor recipients for World War II
List of Freemasons

Notes

References

External links 

Arlington National Cemetery

1883 births
1953 deaths
Military personnel from Washington, D.C.
American expatriates in the Philippines
American prisoners of war in World War II
Burials at Arlington National Cemetery
People from Walla Walla, Washington
Recipients of the Distinguished Service Cross (United States)
Recipients of the Distinguished Service Medal (US Army)
Texas Republicans
United States Army Command and General Staff College alumni
United States Army generals
United States Army generals of World War II
United States Army Medal of Honor recipients
United States Army personnel of World War I
United States Military Academy alumni
Jonathan Mayhew IV
World War II prisoners of war held by Japan
World War II recipients of the Medal of Honor